Kyrila – Insel der Träume is a German-language studio album by Greek singer Demis Roussos, released in 1977 on Philips Records.

One song from the album was released as a single, it was the German version of "Kyrila".

Commercial performance 
The album reached no. 36 in Germany.

Track listing 
All tracks produced by Leo Leandros.

Charts

References

External links 
 Demis Roussos – Kyrila – Insel der Träume at Discogs

1977 albums
Demis Roussos albums
Philips Records albums
Albums produced by Leo Leandros